Un indien dans la ville (An Indian in the city) is a 1994 French film by Hervé Palud. The film had a limited English language release under the title Little Indian, Big City.

Part of the movie was shot in Miami, Florida, United States.

It was later adapted for an American audience under the title Jungle 2 Jungle, set in Manhattan and starring Tim Allen and Martin Short. A tie-in game for the Game Boy was released only in France.

Plot summary
Steph, a commodities broker living in Paris, wants a divorce from his wife Patricia to marry another woman: Charlotte. However, Patricia has been living among the French Guiana Amazonas Indians for the past 13 years, so Steph travels to the Indian village to meet her and ask her to sign the divorce papers.

When they meet, Patricia tells Steph that they have a teenage son, Mimi-Siku, who has been raised as an Amazonian Indian. Patricia tells Steph she will not sign the divorce papers unless Steph takes Mimi-Siku on a visit to Paris, which he agrees to. In Paris, Mimi-Siku meets the children of Steph's colleague Richard and falls in love with his daughter Sophie.

Cast
 Thierry Lhermitte as Stéphane Marchadot
 Patrick Timsit as Richard Montignac 
 Ludwig Briand as Mimi-Siku
 Miou-Miou as Patricia Marchadot
 Arielle Dombasle as Charlotte
 Sonia Vollereaux as Marie Montignac
 Jackie Berroyer as Lawyer Joanovici
 Marc de Jonge as Rossberg
 Louba Guertchikoff as Mrs. Godette
 Philippe Bruneau as Mr. Maréchal
 Dominique Besnehard as Maître Dong
 Cheik Doukouré as Mr. Bonaventure
 Marie-Charlotte Leclaire as Rossberg's Secretary
 Vladimir Kotlyarov as Pavel Kuсhnukov
 Olga Jiroušková as Sonia Kuchnukova
 Chick Ortega as Russian
 Paco Portero as The Snake Man
 Sonia Lezinska as Stewardess
 Marc Brunet as Policeman
 Olivier Hémon as Policeman
 Thierry Desroses as Customs Officer
 Katja Weitzenböck as Miss Van Hodden
 Pauline Pinsolle as Sophie Montignac
 Stanley Zana as Jonathan Montignac
 Gaston Dolle as Benjamin

Release
The film opened in France on 14 December 1994. Shortly after its release in France, Disney saw this film as a possibility to attract a family audience in the United States and considered giving it a limited release in select cities. Before releasing it in select cities, Disney decided to release it under their Touchstone Pictures label as they felt this film had some mature themes for an ordinary Disney film.

As opposed to releasing it in the United States with subtitles leaving the original French dialogue in, Disney hired many cartoon voice-over actors to dub the original French dialogue out and substitute it with an English language format. They also gave the film an American name, Little Indian, Big City. Under its new Americanized title and language dubbing, Touchstone finally released it to a select American audience on March 22, 1996.

Reception

Box office
The film grossed 21 million Franc ($3.9 million) in its opening week in France, finishing second behind The Lion King. It remained in second place for two more weeks before moving to number one for four weeks, grossing $35 million in its first 9 weeks and being the highest-grossing film of the year.

The film flopped during its American release; the film opened in 545 theaters in the United States, but eventually only grossed $1,029,731 in the US and Canada theatrically.

Critical reception
Upon its original American release many American critics had an extremely harsh reaction to the film. Roger Ebert awarded Little Indian, Big City a rare "Zero Stars" rating and called it one of the worst films ever made and that he "detested every moronic minute of it", saying that he was annoyed by the awful dubbing as well as the writing and what he perceived as terrible humor. He ended his original Chicago Sun Times newspaper review by saying "If you under any circumstances see Little Indian, Big City, I will never let you read one of my reviews again". Ebert's colleague Gene Siskel also deplored the film saying that it was likely to be a candidate for the year's (or any year's) worst film. He also said that if the word for the film got big enough in the United States family audiences would have been "hoodwinked into paying to see a totally unprofessional movie." When Siskel and Ebert viewed the film during its original theatrical release, one of the film reels broke out and the third reel of film was missing. A film executive informed Siskel and Ebert that they were allowed to come back the following week and view the particular reel. Siskel and Ebert came back to view the third reel, and by the time they had concluded viewing the whole film Siskel was quoted as saying, "If it was the legendary missing footage from The Magnificent Ambersons, this movie would still suck." Both Siskel and Ebert later went on to claim this as one of the worst motion pictures they had ever seen (though it's not on Ebert's "Most Hated Films" list), and in January 1997, on Siskel and Ebert's "Worst of the Year" program for 1996, Ebert went on to call Little Indian, Big City the second worst film of the year, just behind Mad Dog Time.

Peter Stack of the San Francisco Chronicle said that the dub "lends tackiness to an already inept comedy." A critic from the rival San Francisco Examiner newspaper stated that "the real trouble with this movie is that it isn't even funny. As directed by Herve Palud and written by Palud and Igor Aptekman, it's a feathery thing that does not show off Lhermitte's considerable allure and gifts as a comic. In this movie, he looks like a dope whose mouth is moving in a distinctly French manner, inexplicably spouting the words of some uninspired American goof." Janet Maslin of The New York Times further brutalized the production: "Whatever may have been funny - possibly nothing - about the popular French comedy [...] American audiences can watch it vanish before their eyes. This film has been dubbed into English so dreadfully that it becomes a discordant horror. Though the actors, including Thierry Lhermitte, Arielle Dombasle and Miou Miou, show faint visual signs of gentleness and civility, they now have now become crassly Americanized boors on the film's painful audio track." James Berardinelli opened his review with a paragraph which read, "Little Indian, Big City, the American name given to Herve Palud's 1995 French fish-out-of-water comedy, L'Indian dans la Ville, is easily one of the most tedious viewing experiences of 1996. I came as close to walking out of this movie as anything I have ever watched. No one, no matter how desperate they are for family entertainment, should be subjected to the indignity of sitting through this ninety-minute excuse for a motion picture."

As of today, Rotten Tomatoes gives this film a score of 13% based on 8 reviews.

Home media
It was later released on home video under the VHS format in early 1997 and was re-issued one other time on VHS in mid-1998. The film has not been released on DVD, Blu-ray or any other video formats in the United States.

Official Comic Book

The film was also adapted into a comic book by Vincent Deporter and his wife Judith Rucar. 

 Title	MIMI SIKU - UN INDIEN DANS LA VILLE
 Author	Hervé Palud - Vincent Deporter - Judith Rucar
 Publisher	Glénat, 1994
 ,

External links

Notes and references

1994 films
French adventure comedy films
Films set in Venezuela
1990s French-language films
1990s adventure comedy films
Films about hunter-gatherers
Films adapted into comics
1994 comedy films
Films directed by Hervé Palud
Touchstone Pictures films
1990s French films